Daymond is a given name and surname. Notable people with the name include:

Given name
Daymond John (born 1969), American businessman, television personality, and motivational speaker
Daymond Langkow (born 1976), Canadian ice hockey player

Surname
Emily Daymond (1866–1949), English musician
Irv Daymond (born 1962), Canadian football player
Robbie Daymond (born 1982), American actor

See also
Draymond